NR4 may refer to:

NASCAR Racing 4
Nur (biology)